Allonne may refer to:

 Allonne, Oise, a commune of the Oise département in France
 Allonne, Deux-Sèvres, a commune of the Deux-Sèvres département in France

See also
 Allonnes (disambiguation)
 Allons (disambiguation)